Frantisek Doucha (31 August 1810, Prague-Malá Strana – 3 November 1884, Prague) was Czech priest, writer and translator.

Doucha is one of the most famous Czech literary translators. He was among the most prolific translators of the century, translating works from 14 different languages. His name is often associated with many Shakespearian translations into the Czech language. As a writer, he is one of the founders of Czech children's literature.

External links
 
 Shakespeare in Czech and Slovak

Czech translators
Czech poets
Czech male writers
Translators of William Shakespeare
Translators of Dante Alighieri
1810 births
1884 deaths
19th-century translators
Writers from Prague